The Valea Cetății is a small river in the city of Brașov, Romania. It is intercepted by the Canalul Timiș (Timiș Canal). Its source is in the Postăvarul Massif.

References

Rivers of Romania
Rivers of Brașov County